House of Assembly is a name given to the legislature or lower house of a bicameral parliament. In some countries this may be at a subnational level.

Historically, in British Crown colonies as the colony gained more internal responsible government, the House of Assembly superseded the (usually unelected) Legislative Council as the colonial legislature, often becoming the lower house.

List of Houses of Assembly

Extant

National

Sub-national

Defunct

National

Sub-national

See also
Legislative Assembly
Legislative Council
Parliament

References

Legislatures